Anna Angelica Ulrika Roos (born ) is a Swedish weightlifter, who competed in the 58 kg category and represented Sweden at international competitions. She participated in the women's 58 kg event at the 2016 Summer Olympics. She competed at European Weightlifting Championships most recently at the 2016 European Weightlifting Championships.

Major results

References

External links
 
 
 
 

1989 births
Living people
Swedish female weightlifters
Olympic weightlifters of Sweden
Weightlifters at the 2016 Summer Olympics
Place of birth missing (living people)
European Weightlifting Championships medalists
21st-century Swedish women